Events from the year 1529 in art.

Events
 Carlo de' Medici acquires the Adoration of the Magi by Filippino Lippi
 Alfonso I d'Este, Duke of Ferrara creates the most magnificent gallery of his time, his studiolo or Camerini d'alabastro ('small alabaster room'), now usually known as his "Camerino"
 Jan van Scorel and Maarten van Heemskerck are painting portraits in Haarlem
 First record of Qian Gu painting in Ming Dynasty China

Works

 Albrecht Altdorfer'sThe Battle of Alexander at Issus
 Hans Baldung's Allegory of Music and Woman with Mirror and Queue
 Lucas Cranach the Elder's Martin Luther, The Stag Hunt of the Elector Frederick the Wise and Venus Standing in a Landscape
 Maarten van Heemskerck's Portrait of Anna Codde
 Pontormo's Madonna with Child, Saint Anne and Four Saints

Births
 Valerio Cioli, Italian sculptor (died 1599)
 Giambologna, Sculptor of marble and bronze statuary (died 1608)

Deaths
 Alessandro Araldi, Italian painter active mainly in Parma (born 1460)
 Giovanni della Robbia, Italian Renaissance ceramic artist (born 1469)
 Guillaume de Marcillat, French painter and stained glass artist (born 1470)
 Urs Graf, Swiss Renaissance painter and printmaker of woodcuts, etchings and engravings (born c.1485)
 Rocco Marconi, Italian painter active mainly in Venice and Treviso (b. before 1490)
 Francesco Morone,  Italian painter active mainly in Verona (born 1471)
 Gerino da Pistoia - Italian painter and designer of the Renaissance (born 1480)
 Lo Spagna, Spanish-born Italian painter of the High-Renaissance (born unknown)
 Peter Vischer the Elder, German sculptor (born 1455)
1526/1529: Hans Maler zu Schwaz, German painter and portraitist (born 1480)

 
Years of the 16th century in art